Juan Miguel Paz (born 14 May 1966) is a Colombian fencer. He competed in the épée events at the 1988, 1992 and 1996 Summer Olympics.

References

1966 births
Living people
Colombian male épée fencers
Olympic fencers of Colombia
Fencers at the 1988 Summer Olympics
Fencers at the 1992 Summer Olympics
Fencers at the 1996 Summer Olympics
Pan American Games medalists in fencing
Pan American Games silver medalists for Colombia
Pan American Games bronze medalists for Colombia
Fencers at the 1987 Pan American Games
Fencers at the 1991 Pan American Games
Fencers at the 1995 Pan American Games
Fencers at the 1999 Pan American Games
20th-century Colombian people
21st-century Colombian people